Thato Mokeke (born 1 April 1989) is a South African professional soccer player who plays for Cape Town City, as a central defender.

Career
Born in Cape Town, Mokeke has played club football for SuperSport United, Winners Park, Ajax Cape Town, Cape Town City and Chippa United.

He made his international debut for South Africa in 2014.

References

1989 births
Living people
South African soccer players
South Africa international soccer players
SuperSport United F.C. players
Winners Park F.C. players
Cape Town Spurs F.C. players
Cape Town City F.C. (2016) players
Chippa United F.C. players
Association football central defenders